The Qatar diplomatic crisis was a diplomatic incident in the Middle East that began on 5 June 2017 when Saudi Arabia, the United Arab Emirates, Bahrain and Egypt severed diplomatic relations with Qatar and banned Qatar-registered planes and ships from utilising their airspace, land and sea routes, along with Saudi Arabia blocking Qatar’s only land crossing, as a de facto blockade. The crisis ended in January 2021 following a resolution between Saudi Arabia and Qatar.

The Saudi-led coalition cited Qatar's alleged support for terrorism as the main reason for their actions, alleging that Qatar had violated a 2014 agreement with the members of the Gulf Cooperation Council (GCC), of which Qatar is a member. Saudi Arabia and other countries have criticized Al Jazeera and Qatar's relations with Iran. Qatar explained that it had provided assistance to some opposition groups, including Islamist groups (such as the Muslim Brotherhood), but consistently negated aiding militant groups linked to al-Qaeda or the Islamic State of Iraq and the Levant (ISIL). Qatar also emphasized that it has long assisted the United States in the War on Terror, especially via the Qatar-based Aludaid US military base, and the ongoing military intervention against ISIL.

One day into the crisis, the Saudi-led coalition was joined by Jordan, and were further supported thereafter by the Maldives, Mauritania, Senegal, Djibouti, the Comoros, and the Tobruk-based government in Libya in severing relations with Qatar and closing the country's land routes for its food imports. The demands against Qatar included reducing diplomatic relations with Iran, stopping military coordination with Turkey, and closing Al Jazeera; Qatar refused to agree to any of the Saudi-led coalition's demands. Initial supply disruptions were minimised by additional imports from Iran, with which Qatar restored full diplomatic relations in August 2017, and Turkey.

On 4 January 2021, Qatar and Saudi Arabia agreed to a resolution of the crisis brokered by Kuwait and the United States, which stated that Saudi Arabia will reopen its border with Qatar and begin the process for reconciliation. An agreement and final communiqué signed on 5 January 2021 following a GCC summit at Al-'Ula marks the resolution of the crisis. According to Foreign Policy, the publication views the crisis as a failure for Saudi Arabia, the UAE, Bahrain, and Egypt, because Qatar generated closer ties to Iran and Turkey, and became economically and militarily stronger and more autonomous.

Background

Since he took power in 1995 as Emir of Qatar, Hamad bin Khalifa al-Thani believed Qatar could find security by transforming itself from a Saudi appendage to a fully sovereign state, equal  to Saudi Arabia. Saudi Arabia withdrew its ambassador to Doha from 2002 to 2008 to try to pressure Qatar to curb its individualistic tendencies. This approach broadly failed. The Arab Spring left a power vacuum which both Saudi Arabia and Qatar sought to fill, with Qatar being supportive of the revolutionary wave and Saudi Arabia opposing it; since both states are allies of the United States, they avoid direct conflict with one another. Qatar has had differences with other Arab governments on a number of issues: it broadcasts Al Jazeera; it is accused of maintaining good relations with Iran; and it has supported the Muslim Brotherhood in the past. Qatar has been accused of sponsoring terrorism. Some countries have faulted Qatar for funding rebel groups in Syria, including al-Qaeda’s affiliate in Syria, the al-Nusra Front, although Saudi Arabia has done the same. Qatar has allowed the Afghan Taliban to set up a political office inside the country. Qatar is a close ally of the United States, hosting the largest American base in the Middle East, Al Udeid Air Base.

In March 2014, Saudi Arabia, the United Arab Emirates, Bahrain and Egypt withdrew their ambassadors from Qatar. This severing of relations was the first of its kind since the establishment of the Gulf Cooperation Council (GCC). The crisis affected the GCC negatively at first – raising questions among member states, revealing shifts in their political agendas, and changing the balance of power in the region to some extent.

The exact reasons for the break in diplomatic relations in 2017 are unclear, but contemporary news coverage primarily attributed this to several events in April and May 2017:

April 2017 hostage negotiations

In April 2017, Qatar was involved in a deal with both Sunni and Shi'ite militants in Iraq and Syria. The deal had two goals. The immediate goal was to secure the return of 26 Qatari hostages (including Qatari royals) who had been kidnapped by Shi'ite militants while falcon hunting in southern Iraq and kept in captivity for more than 16 months. The second goal was to get both Sunni and Shi'ite militants in Syria to allow humanitarian aid to pass through and allow the safe evacuation of civilians. According to the New York Times, this deal allowed the evacuation of at least 2,000 civilians from the Syrian village of Madaya alone. What outraged Saudi Arabia and the UAE was the amount of money Qatar paid to secure the deal. According to the Financial Times, Qatar paid $700 million to multiple Iranian-backed Shi'a militias in Iraq, $120–140 million to Tahrir al-Sham, and $80 million to Ahrar al-Sham.

Riyadh Summit 2017

As part of the Riyadh Summit in late May 2017, many world leaders, including US President Donald Trump visited the region. Trump gave strong support for Saudi Arabia's efforts in fighting against states and groups allied with Iran and the Muslim Brotherhood, leading to an arms deal between the countries. The Business Insider reported that "Elliott Broidy a top fundraiser for President Donald Trump; and George Nader, Broidy's business partner ... pushed for anti-Qatar policies at the highest levels of government, and expected large consulting contracts from Saudi Arabia and the UAE." Trump's support may have induced other Sunni states to fall in line with Saudi Arabia to take a stance against Qatar. Trump's public support for Saudi Arabia, according to The New York Times, emboldened the kingdom and sent a chill through other Gulf states, including Oman and Kuwait, that fear that any country that defies the Saudis or the United Arab Emirates could face ostracism as Qatar had. The Saudi-led move was at once an opportunity for the GCC partners and Egypt to punish their adversaries in Doha, please their allies in Washington, and remove attention from their own shortcomings and challenges.

Hacking operations against Qatar
According to Qatar-based Al Jazeera and the American FBI, the Qatar News Agency website and other government media platforms were hacked in May 2017, where hackers posted fake remarks on the official Qatar News Agency attributed to the Emir of Qatar, Sheikh Tamim bin Hamad Al Thani, that expressed support for Iran, Hamas, Hezbollah, and Israel. The emir was quoted as saying: "Iran represents a regional and Islamic power that cannot be ignored and it is unwise to face up against it. It is a big power in the stabilization of the region." Qatar reported that the statements were false and did not know their origin. Despite this, the remarks were widely publicized in the various non-Qatari Arab news media, including UAE-based Sky News Arabia and Saudi-owned Al Arabiya. On 3 June 2017, the Twitter account of Bahraini foreign minister Khalid bin Ahmed Al Khalifa was hacked.

Initially alleged intelligence gathered by the US security agencies indicated that Russian hackers were behind the intrusion first reported by the Qataris. However, a US official briefed on the inquiry told the New York Times that it "was unclear whether the hackers were state-sponsored" and The Guardian diplomatic editor Patrick Wintour reported that "it is believed that the Russian government was not involved in the hacks; instead, freelance hackers were paid to undertake the work on behalf of some other state or individual." A US diplomat said that Russia and its ally Iran stood to benefit from sowing discord among US allies in the region, "particularly if they made it more difficult for the United States to use Qatar as a major base." The FBI sent a team of investigators to Doha to help the Qatari government investigate the hacking incident. Later, the New York Times reported that the hacking incidents may be part of a long-running cyberwar between Qatar and other Gulf countries that was only revealed to the public during the recent incidents, and they noted how Saudi and UAE media picked up the statement made by the hacked media in less than 20 minutes and began interviewing many well-prepared commentators against Qatar.

US intelligence agencies believe that the hacking was done by the United Arab Emirates, according to a Washington Post report published on 16 July. The intelligence officials stated that the hacking was discussed among Emirati officials on 23 May, one day before the operation took place. The UAE denied any involvement in the hacking. It was announced on 26 August 2017, that five individuals allegedly involved in the hacking were arrested in Turkey.

A former employee of the US’ National Security Agency (NSA), David Evenden was hired by the UAE to work at the cyberespionage firm CyberPoint. The Emirates signaled a green flag to Evenden and his team to run hacking operations against Qatar, in order to scavenge substance that Qatar has been involved in funding the Muslim Brotherhood at some point in time. In its major stratagem against Qatar, the UAE allowed Evenden and the network of other former NSA employees to neglect rationalizations and fetch confidential data. This team at CyberPoint carried out several global hacking attempts, including against the Qatari royals, the officials at FIFA, and even the Internet critics of the UAE. In 2015, the Emirates, using these NSA employees, hacked the emails of Michelle Obama, before her scheduled visit to an event in Qatar. Mrs. Obama was invited by Qatar's Sheikha Moza bint Nasser. The email hack provided the UAE with every piece of information exchanged between the two women and their staff.

Hacking of UAE ambassador's email 

In May 2017, the email account of the UAE's ambassador to the US, Yousef Al-Otaiba, was hacked. The emails were seen by the Huffington Post as an attempt "to embarrass" Al Otaiba because they showed links between the UAE and the US-based pro-Israel Foundation for Defense of Democracies. The hack was seen as a move to benefit Qatar, which deepened the rift even more between the two sides. According to The Intercept, Yousef al-Otaiba has been reportedly linked to buy influence for UAE-led campaigns in the White House.

Severance of diplomatic and economic ties
Between 5 and 6 June 2017, Saudi Arabia, the UAE, Yemen, Egypt, the Maldives, and Bahrain all separately announced that they were cutting diplomatic ties with Qatar; among these Bahrain was the first to announce the severing of ties at 02:50 GMT in the early morning of 5 June.

A variety of diplomatic actions were taken. Saudi Arabia and the UAE notified ports and shipping agents not to receive Qatari vessels or ships owned by Qatari companies or individuals. Saudi Arabia closed the border with Qatar. Saudi Arabia restricted its airspace to Qatar Airways. Instead, Qatar was forced to reroute flights to Africa and Europe through Iranian airspace. Saudi Arabia's central bank advised banks not to trade with Qatari banks in Qatari riyals. Additionally, Qatari citizens in those countries were required to return home to Qatar within two weeks.

Qatar verbally criticized the ban. The Foreign Ministry of Qatar criticized the ban, arguing that it undermined Qatar's sovereignty. The foreign minister of Qatar, Mohammed bin Abdulrahman Al-Thani, said that Saudi statements regarding Qatar were contradictory: on the one hand, Saudi Arabia claimed Qatar was supporting Iran, on the other hand, it claimed Qatar was funding Sunni extremists fighting against Iran.

Saudi Arabia's move was welcomed by United States president Donald Trump despite a large US presence at the Al Udeid Air Base, the primary base of US air operations against the Islamic State of Iraq and the Levant. However, Secretary of State Rex W. Tillerson and Defense Secretary James Mattis worked on de-escalating the situation. Tillerson, as the CEO of ExxonMobil, was acquainted with the current and previous emirs of Qatar. A number of countries in the region, including Turkey, Russia and Iran, called for the crisis to be resolved through peaceful negotiations.

All GCC countries involved in the announcement ordered their citizens out of Qatar. Three Gulf states (Saudi Arabia, UAE, Bahrain) gave Qatari visitors and residents two weeks to leave their countries. The foreign ministries of Bahrain and Egypt gave Qatari diplomats 48 hours to leave their countries. Qatar was expelled from the Saudi Arabian-led intervention in Yemen and Yemen's government itself has cut ties. Kuwait and Oman remained neutral.

The Tobruk-based government of Libya claimed to have cut diplomatic ties with Qatar despite having had no actual diplomatic relations with that country.

The semi-autonomous Somali regions of Puntland, Hirshabelle, and Galmudug each issued statements cutting ties with Qatar, in opposition to the neutral stance of the federal government of Somalia.

Other countries made statements condemning Qatar, including Gabon and Eritrea.

Demands on Qatar and responses
On 22 June 2017, Saudi Arabia, the United Arab Emirates (UAE), Egypt, and Bahrain issued Qatar a list of 13 demands through Kuwaiti mediation, requiring Qatar to agree within 10 days (2 July 2017). According to reports on 23 June, the demands included:

Closing Al Jazeera and its affiliate stations.
Closing other news outlets that Qatar funds, directly and indirectly, including Arabi21, Rassd, Al-Araby Al-Jadeed and Middle East Eye.
Closing the Turkish military base in Qatar, and terminating the Turkish military presence and any joint military cooperation with Turkey inside Qatar.
Reducing diplomatic relations with Iran. Only trade and commerce with Iran that complies with US and international sanctions were to be permitted. 
Expelling any members of the Islamic Revolutionary Guard Corps (IRGC) and cutting off military and intelligence cooperation with Iran.
"Severing ties with terrorist, ideological and sectarian organizations including the Muslim Brotherhood, Hamas, the Islamic State of Iraq and the Levant (ISIL), Al-Qaeda, Hezbollah, and Jabhat Fateh al Sham, formerly al Qaeda's branch in Syria", according to one Arab official, who insisted Qatar must announce its compliance. 
Surrendering all designated terrorists in Qatar, and stopping all means of funding for individuals, groups or organisations that have been designated as terrorists.
Ending interference in the four countries' domestic and foreign affairs and having contact with their political oppositions.
Stopping granting citizenship to wanted nationals from Saudi Arabia, the United Arab Emirates, Egypt and Bahrain.
Revoking Qatari citizenship for existing nationals where such citizenship violates those countries' laws.
Paying reparations for years of alleged wrongs.
Submitting to monitoring for 10 years.
Aligning itself with the other Gulf and Arab countries militarily, politically, socially and economically, as well as on economic matters, in line with an agreement reached with Saudi Arabia in 2014.

According to a report by the Qatar-endowed Al Jazeera, "Qatari officials immediately dismissed the document as neither reasonable [nor] actionable." Iran denounced the blockade. US Secretary of State Rex Tillerson said that some of the demands would be very hard to meet but encouraged further dialogue.

On 3 July, Saudi Arabia accepted a Kuwaiti request for the deadline to be extended by 48 hours.

On 5 July, foreign ministers from Egypt, Saudi Arabia, United Arab Emirates and Bahrain met in Cairo after receiving a response from Qatar to their list of demands. The meeting, intended to resolve the dispute, ended in a stalemate when Saudi foreign minister Adel al-Jubeir said that the political and economic boycott of Qatar would remain until it changed its policies. Also on the same day, the Saudi-led bloc withdrew its insistence on compliance with the 13 specific demands tabled the month before, instead asking Qatar to accept six broad principles, which included commitments to combat terrorism and extremism and to end acts of provocation and incitement.

However, by 30 July 2017, the 13 demands had been reinstated. In the meantime, a joint statement was made in Cairo in order to restart the negotiation process with Qatar, which included six principles:

 Commitment to combat extremism and terrorism in all its forms and to prevent their financing or the provision of safe havens.
 Prohibiting all acts of incitement and all forms of expression which spread, incite, promote or justify hatred and violence.
 Full commitment to the Riyadh Agreement 2013 and the supplementary agreement and its executive mechanism for 2014 within the framework of the Gulf Cooperation Council (GCC) for Arab States.
 Commitment to all the outcomes of the Arab-Islamic-US Summit held in Riyadh in May 2017.
 To refrain from interfering in the internal affairs of States and from supporting illegal entities.
 The responsibility of all States of the international community to confront all forms of extremism and terrorism as a threat to international peace and security.

Global reactions

United States

United States President Donald Trump claimed credit for engineering the diplomatic crisis in a series of tweets. On 6 June, Trump began by tweeting: "During my recent trip to the Middle East I stated that there can no longer be funding of Radical Ideology. Leaders pointed to Qatar – look!" An hour and a half later, he remarked on Twitter that it was "good to see the Saudi Arabia visit with the King and 50 countries already paying off. They said they would take a hard line on funding extremism, and all reference was pointing to Qatar. Perhaps this will be the beginning of the end to the horror of terrorism!" This was in contrast to attempts by the Pentagon and the Department of State to remain neutral. The Pentagon praised Qatar for hosting the Al Udeid Air Base and for its "enduring commitment to regional security." US Ambassador to Qatar, Dana Shell Smith, sent a similar message. Earlier, the US Secretary of State had taken a neutral stance and called for dialogue. On the same day, Trump also had a phone call with Saudi King Salman and rejected a Saudi proposal to invade Qatar. Instead, the United States requested Kuwaiti mediation with the goal of resolving the conflict.

On 8 June, President Donald Trump, during a phone call with the Emir of Qatar Tamim bin Hamad Al Thani, offered to act as a mediator in the conflict with a White House meeting between the parties if necessary. The offer was declined, and a Qatari official stated, "The emir has no plans to leave Qatar while the country is under a blockade." On 9 June, Trump once again put the blame on Qatar, calling the blockade "hard but necessary" while claiming that Qatar had been funding terrorism at a "very high level" and described the country as having an "extremist ideology in terms of funding." This statement was in conflict with Secretary of State Tillerson's comments on the same day, which called on Gulf states to ease the blockade. In 13 June 2017 after meeting with Tillerson in Washington, Saudi Foreign Minister Adel al-Jubeir stated that there was "no blockade" and "what we have done is we have denied them use of our airspace, and this is our sovereign right," and that the King Salman Centre for Humanitarian Aid and Relief would send food or medical aid to Qatar if needed. The following day, Trump authorized the sale of $12 billion of U.S. weapons to Qatar. According to The intercept, Saudi Arabia and the UAE lobbied Trump to fire Rex Tillerson because he "intervened to stop a secret Saudi-led, UAE-backed plan to invade and essentially conquer Qatar."

On 21 June 2017, Trump told a crowd in Iowa that "We cannot let these incredibly rich nations fund radical Islamic terror or terrorism of any kind", noting that after his visit to Riyadh in May 2017 to meet with Saudi King Salman and urge an end to terror funding, "He has taken it to heart. And now they're fighting with other countries that have been funding terrorism. And I think we had a huge impact."

Other countries
 
Multiple countries, the European Union and the United Nations called for resolution of the diplomatic crisis through dialogue:

 

Israel's former defense minister, Avigdor Lieberman, described the situation as an "opportunity" for Israel, stating, "Some [Arab countries'] interests overlap with Israeli interests, including the issue with al-Jazeera." He went on to describe Al Jazeera Media Network as an "incitement machine" and "pure propaganda." Israeli Prime Minister Benjamin Netanyahu has demanded AJMN shut down its offices in Israel.

Reports that Mauritius had cut ties with Qatar were refuted by the Mauritian government. A report in the Saudi Gazette incorrectly stated that Mauritius had broken off ties with Qatar and that Mauritius' Vice Prime-Minister had issued a communiqué pledging his country's support for Saudi Arabia. This prompted further erroneous reports by other outlets. However, Mauritian Vice Prime Minister Showkutally Soodhun in an interview with Le Défi Media Group of Mauritius refuted claims that he had issued any such communiqué, and Mauritius' Ministry of Foreign Affairs issued a statement that Mauritius continued to maintain diplomatic relations with Qatar.

Pakistan stated that it had no plans to cut diplomatic relations with Qatar. The National Assembly passed a resolution urging all countries to "show restraint and resolve their differences through dialogue." The Pakistani Federal minister for Petroleum and Natural Resources said that "Pakistan will continue to import liquefied natural gas (LNG) from Qatar." A six-member Qatari delegation headed by a special envoy of the Qatari Emir visited Pakistan and asked Pakistan to play a positive role in resolving the diplomatic crisis former, and the Prime Minister of Pakistan, Nawaz Sharif, was quoted as saying that "Pakistan would do 'all it can' to help resolve the crisis," as well as calling on the Muslim world to play a role in ending hostilities. A TRT report stated that Pakistan would deploy 20,000 troops in Qatar, which the Pakistani foreign ministry denied.

The Philippines suspended the deployment of migrant workers to Qatar on 6 June 2017. However, the next day, they allowed the deployment of returning workers and those with an Overseas Employment Certificate, but still maintained the suspension of the deployment of new workers. The suspension was later fully lifted on 15 June.

On 8 June 2017, Egypt's deputy UN Ambassador Ihab Moustafa called for the United Nations Security Council to launch an investigation into accusations that Qatar "paid up to $1 billion to a terrorist group active in Iraq" to free 26 Qatari hostages, including members of its royal family, which payment would violate UN resolutions. The Qataris were kidnapped on 16 December 2015 from a desert camp for falcon hunters in southern Iraq. The hostages were released eighteen months later in April 2017. Qatari diplomats responded to the Egyptian calls for an investigation by reaffirming their commitment to the UN resolutions towards eliminating the financing of terrorism.

In June 2017, the government of Qatar hired American attorney and politician John Ashcroft to lobby on its behalf and help the state deny international allegations of supporting terror.

On 24 November 2017, deputy chief of Dubai Police Lieutenant General Dhahi Khalfan, blamed the 2017 Sinai attack on Al-Jazeera's reporting and called for the bombing of Al-Jazeera's headquarters by the Saudi-led coalition.

Israel hasn’t shared a direct diplomatic relation with Qatar since 2012, yet over the past few years, the country has emerged as an unlikely peacemaker in the Middle East by extending a helping hand to Doha and strengthening its ties with its nemesis, UAE. Israel offered Doha to work along with it on Gaza’s reconstruction in June 2020, changing Washington’s narrative towards Qatar concerning its relation with Hamas as one focused on getting all parties to cooperate in support of the peace plan initiated by the Trump administration. In 2017, Israel condemned the legislation introduced in the US Congress, designating Qatar as a state sponsor of terrorism for having ties with Hamas. The legislation was filed by Ed Royce, a Republican, and the then-Chairman of the House Foreign Affairs Committee. In the meantime, Israel also strengthened its partnership with the UAE by holding a meeting in Washington of the ambassadors of UAE and Bahrain with Prime Minister Benjamin Netanyahu. Israel maintained a balance between strengthening its relations with Abu Dhabi and simultaneously extending a helping hand to Doha.

In the Country Reports on Terrorism released by US Department of state on March 2022, CT cooperation signed in 2017 by Qatar included the participation of the United States and Qatar on terrorist screening and aviation security. In 2019, the Qatari government drafted new AML/CFT legislation, which was finalized and passed into law on September 11, 2019 which stated that Qatar maintains an inter-agency National Anti-Terrorism Committee (NATC) composed of representatives from more than 10 government agencies. The NATC is tasked with formulating Qatar’s CT policy, ensuring inter-agency coordination, fulfilling Qatar’s obligations to counter terrorism under international conventions, and participating in multilateral conferences on terrorism. U.S. officials met regularly with the chairman of the NATC to discuss implementation of the CT MOU and overall CT cooperation. The Qatar State Security Bureau (SSB) maintained an aggressive posture toward monitoring internal terrorism-related activities. Qatar is a member of MENAFATF. FIU, known as the Qatar Financial Information Unit, is a member of the Egmont Group. Qatar is also a member of the Defeat-ISIS Coalition’s CIFG and the TFTC. In collaboration with other TFTC member states, Qatar in 2019 imposed one round of sanctions against individuals and entities affiliated with the Iranian regime’s terror-support networks in the region. Qatar continued to maintain restrictions, imposed in 2017, on the overseas activities of Qatari charities, requiring all such activity to be conducted through one of two approved charities in an effort to better monitor charitable giving for terrorist financing abuse.

The Syrian Coalition of Revolutionary and Opposition Forces said "Syria is awaiting a more active Arab role that will contribute to putting an end to the nearly 10-year suffering of the Syrian people; help the Syrian people achieve their aspirations for freedom and independence; getting rid of the murderous Assad regime and Iranian sectarian militias; and putting an end the Iranian subversive project in Syria and the region."

United Nations
In November 2020, United Nations special rapporteur Alena Douhan published a preliminary report condemning the Saudi-led blockade of the State of Qatar and urged to lift the ban immediately as a result of human rights violations of the people of Qatar. The UAE, Saudi Arabia, Bahrain and Egypt-led blockade of Qatar were concluded as illegal by the special rapporteur. Douhan has stated to present a final report to the United Nations Human Rights Council in September 2021.

Reportedly, it is prohibited under the UN Charter to impose any unilateral coercive measures against its member states unless authorized by the organization’s relevant organs or found consistent with the principles composing the charter.

Impact

Logistical implications

On 6 June 2017, Emirates Post of UAE halted postal services to Qatar.

Nearly 80 percent of Qatar's food requirements come from Persian Gulf Arab neighbors, with only 1 percent being produced domestically and even imports from outside the Gulf states usually crossing the now closed land border with Saudi Arabia. Immediately after the cutting of relations, local reports indicated residents swarmed grocery stores in hopes of stockpiling food. Many food delivery trucks were idled along the Saudi-Qatari border. On 8 June 2017, Qatari Foreign Minister Sheikh Mohammed bin Abdulrahman al-Thani said, "We're not worried about a food shortage, we're fine. We can live forever like this, we are well prepared." Qatar has been in talks with both Turkey and Iran to secure supply of food. On 11 June 2017, Iran sent four cargo planes with fruit and vegetables and promised to continue the supply. Turkey has pledged food and water supplies to go along with their troop deployment at their Turkish military base in Qatar.

As part of the Qatari government's response to lost food imports, it provided support to domestic agricultural company Baladna, which built a new dairy farm with imported cattle that was planned to produce enough milk to fulfill domestic demand for dairy products by June 2018.

Air travel
All airlines based in these countries, including Emirates, suspended flights to and from Qatar. Gulf Air, EgyptAir, flydubai, Air Arabia, Saudi Arabian Airlines and Etihad Airways suspended their flights to and from Qatar. Bahrain, Egypt, Saudi Arabia, and the United Arab Emirates are also banning overflights by aircraft registered in Qatar (A7). Instead Qatar has rerouted flights to Africa and Europe via Iran, paying a "hefty" overflight fee for each such flight.

Qatar Airways in response also suspended its flight operations to Saudi Arabia, the UAE, Egypt, and Bahrain.

Due to the blockade of Qatar Airways from the airspace of Saudi Arabia, the UAE, Bahrain and Egypt, Oman Air has taken up a significant role transporting travelers from and to Doha, mostly through Iranian airspace, while still allowing Qatari passport holders to book flights. The travel embargo has had a significant impact on foreign nationals living and working in Qatar, with about 100,000 Egyptians and citizens from other countries stranded there, unable to book direct flights or obtain travel documents for their return. Per request from Qatar, the blockade was under review by the International Civil Aviation Organization (ICAO), a UN-agency seeking a "consensus-based solution" for the resolution of the crisis.

On 31 July 2017, the agency asserted its neutrality in the conflict and announced that Qatar Airways will have access to three contingency routes over international waters in early August based on a preliminary agreement reached with the Saudi aviation authority (GACA) early that month. The ICAO, based in Montreal, also reminded all member countries to comply with the 1944 Chicago Convention on International Civil Aviation and its agenda.

In December 2020, Qatar’s ambassador to the United Nations sent a letter to the UN Secretary-General António Guterres and the Security Council members, reporting the airspace offenses by four Bahraini fighter jets. He said that Bahrain’s military aircraft violated Qatar’s airspace on 9 December by flying over the country’s territorial waters.

Shipping
The United Arab Emirates banned Qatar-flagged ships from calling at Fujairah. It also banned vessels from Qatar from the port and vessels at the port from sailing directly to Qatar. Similar restrictions were put in place at Jebel Ali, which pre-boycott used to handle over 85% of shipborne cargo for Qatar. Bahrain, Egypt and Saudi Arabia also banned Qatar-flagged ships from their ports.

On 8 June 2017 shipping giant Maersk was unable to transport in or out of Qatar entirely. Due to Qatar's shallow ports, large cargo ships are required to dock at Jebel Ali or other nearby ports where a feeder service transports the goods into Qatar. In response, Maersk and Swiss-based MSC vessels for Qatar were rerouted to Salalah and Sohar in Oman. Particularly smaller shipments of perishable and frozen foods have taken that route.

On 12 June 2017, Chinese shipping company COSCO announced suspension of services to and from Qatar. Taiwan's Evergreen Marine and Hong Kong's Orient Overseas Container Line had already suspended services.

Media ban
Hamad Saif al-Shamsi, the Attorney-General of the United Arab Emirates announced on 7 June that publishing expressions of sympathy towards Qatar through social media, or any type of written, visual or verbal form is considered illegal under UAE's Federal Penal Code and the Federal law on Combating Information Technology Crimes. Violators of this offense face between 3 and 15 years imprisonment, a fine of up to 500,000 emirati dirhams ($136,000) or both. Bahrain also issued a similar statement with a penalty up to 5 years imprisonment and a fine.

Saudi Arabia, Egypt, Bahrain, and the UAE all blocked access to Qatari news agencies, including the controversial Qatar-based Al Jazeera. Saudi Arabia shut down the local office of Al Jazeera Media Network. The BBC speculated that changes to Al Jazeera would be a necessary part of any peaceful resolution. In June, Qatar-based beIN Sports (a spin-off from Al Jazeera) was also blocked by Saudi Arabia and the UAE. The UAE lifted this ban the following month, but the channels remained banned in Saudi Arabia, and the channels' programming was illegally rebranded and redistributed by a large-scale pirate television operation known as beoutQ. beoutQ operated out of Saudi Arabia using the Arabsat satellites, and was promoted by Saudi politicians.

In 2018, the Saudi government also began to target beIN Sports for allegedly holding monopoly in sports broadcasting, including revoking its broadcast licenses based on accusations of anti-competitive behaviour, and pulling its rights to the Asian Football Confederation in the Kingdom in 2019. beIN Sports considered the moves to be politically motivated, while it was feared that the service was normalising the practice of piracy.

Finances

At the start of the crisis, Standard & Poor's downgraded Qatar's debt by one notch from AA to AA-. Qatar's stock market dropped 7.3% on the first day of the crisis, and reached a 9.7% drop by 8 June 2017. Additionally, in the first months following the crisis the government of Qatar injected $38.5 billion, which was equivalent to 23% of the country's GDP, to support the country's economy and its banking sector.

As per S&P Global Ratings, banks in Qatar are strong enough to survive a withdrawal of all Gulf country deposits.

Despite the ongoing diplomatic blockade led by Saudi Arabia, international banks like HSBC, Goldman Sachs and others sought to repair their ties with Qatar by building stronger financial and business relations. Saudi Arabia and the United Arab Emirates informally warned the bankers not to have close relations with Doha or else there would be consequences.

On 20 January 2019, Sheikh Tamim bin Hamad Al Thani attended the opening session of the Arab Economic Summit in Beirut, Lebanon. This helped Qatar increase its influence and soft power in the region. Sheikh Tamim Bin Hamad Al Thani and Mauritanian President Mohamed Ould Abdel Aziz were the only two Arab leaders to attend the summit. Since Sheikh Tamim was the only GCC leader to attend, he received praise from the President of Lebanon himself, Michel Aoun. Hilal Khashan, a professor of political science at the American University of Beirut, said "He became the star of the summit."

Energy
Qatar is a global leader in liquefied natural gas production. Despite the severing of ties, Qatari natural gas continues to flow to the UAE and Oman through Abu Dhabi based Dolphin Energy's pipeline. The pipeline meets about 30–40 percent of UAE's energy needs. Shipping constraints from the crisis have also rerouted multiple shipments of oil and gas to and from the Gulf, which has caused reverberations in many local energy markets. 
On 8 June 2017, gas futures spiked nearly 4 percent in the United Kingdom, which had nearly a third of all its imported gas arriving from Qatar. A secondary effect of the dispute has been on worldwide supplies of helium, which is often extracted from natural gas. Qatar is the world's second largest supplier of helium (the US ranks first).

In March 2019, Qatar lodged a complaint to International Atomic Energy Agency regarding the United Arab Emirates Barakah nuclear power plant, stating that it poses a serious threat to regional stability and the environment. The UAE denied that there are safety issues with the plant, which is being built by Korea Electric Power Corporation (KEPCO) with operation by French utility Électricité de France, and stated “The United Arab Emirates ... adheres to its commitment to the highest standards of nuclear safety, security and non-proliferation.”

23rd and 24th Gulf Cup
The 23rd Arabian Gulf Cup was scheduled to be hosted in Qatar. In November 2017, Saudi Arabia, United Arab Emirates, and Bahrain pulled out of the Gulf Cup due to the Qatar boycott. On 7 December 2017, it was announced that Kuwait will host the football tournament after Saudi Arabia, United Arab Emirates, and Bahrain all withdrew because of the diplomatic crisis.

Qatar hosted the 24th Arabian Gulf Cup in 2019. Bahrain, Saudi Arabia, and United Arab Emirates announced their participation in the tournament on 12 November (two weeks before the event kicked off), reversing an attempted second boycott of the event.

Qatari military relations

On 7 June 2017, the Turkish parliament passed, with 240 votes in favour and 98 against, a legislative act first drafted in May allowing Turkish troops to be deployed to a Turkish military base in Qatar.  During a speech on 13 June 2017, the President of Turkey, Recep Tayyip Erdoğan, condemned the boycott of Qatar as "inhumane and against Islamic values" and stated that "victimising Qatar through smear campaigns serves no purpose". On 23 June 2017, Turkey rejected demands to shut down its military base in Qatar.

Qatar hosts about 10,000 US troops at Al Udeid Air Base, which houses the forward operating base of United States Central Command that is strategically located for US airstrikes in Syria, Iraq, and Afghanistan. A Pentagon spokesperson claimed the diplomatic crisis would not affect the US military missions in Qatar.

On 30 January 2018 an inaugural United States-Qatar Strategic Dialogue meeting was held, co-chaired by U.S. Secretary of State Rex Tillerson, U.S. Secretary of Defense Jim Mattis, Qatari Deputy Prime Minister and Minister of State for Defence Affairs Khalid al-Attiyah and Qatari Deputy Prime Minister and Foreign Minister Mohammed bin Abdulrahman Al Thani. The meeting expressed the need for an immediate resolution of the crisis which respects Qatar's sovereignty. In a Joint Declaration on Security Cooperation, the United States expressed its readiness to deter and quell any external threat to Qatar's territorial integrity. Qatar offered to help fund the expansion of facilities at US bases in Qatar.

On 25 March 2018, the United States Central Command (CENTCOM) officially quashed rumours that the Incirlik Air Base in Turkey and the Al Udeid Air Base in Qatar will be closed despite the ongoing regional conflict.

In January 2018, Qatar's ambassador communicated with Russia with the intent to purchase S-400 surface-to-air missiles. Both countries signed an agreement on military and technical cooperation in 2017. In May 2018, the French daily newspaper Le Monde reported that King Salman of Saudi Arabia would take military action if Qatar installed the Russian air defence system. However, a senior Russian official remarked the system would still be delivered even against the will of Saudi Arabia. The Saudis were themselves approaching Russia to improve economic and military ties in 2017, but bargaining relating to the arms deal was hindered by concerns the United States and Saudi Arabia had with regard to the Russian position towards Iran's military and strategic involvement in the Middle East.

In June 2018, Qatar expressed its wish to join NATO. However, NATO declined Qatar's membership proposal, stating that only additional European countries could join according to Article 10 of NATO's founding treaty. Qatar and NATO have previously signed a security agreement together in January 2018.

Arab League Council 2017
During the 148th Session of the Arab League Council at the level of Foreign Ministers which was held in Cairo, Qatar’s State Minister for Foreign Affairs, Sultan Al Muraikhi, got into a heated argument with Saudi delegate Ahmad Al Qattan. The argument was caused after Al Muraikhi gave a short speech about how Qatar had to go back to supporting Iran after it recalled the Qatari ambassador to Iran to support Saudi Arabia in 2016.

2019 Asian Cup
During the semi-final match between the Qatar national football team and the tournament hosts the United Arab Emirates, the UAE supporters threw shoes and bottles onto the pitch. This conduct was preceded by booing the Qatari national anthem. Qatar won 4–0, paving the way to their first Asian Cup final and eventual title.

A British-Sudanese football fan was allegedly beaten by fans for wearing a Qatar football shirt to a match in which Qatar was playing and then, after investigation by the UAE police, arrested for wasting police time and making false statements of being assaulted. According to The Guardian, the fan was arrested for wearing a Qatar football shirt. The claim was denied by UAE authorities who stated the fan was arrested for wasting police time and making false assault claims to the police. The UAE police said that the fan had admitted to making false statements. A UAE official in London stated "He was categorically not arrested for wearing a Qatar football shirt. This is instead an instance of a person seeking media attention and wasting police time." According to photos shown by The National, fans were seen waving the Qatari flag and wearing Qatari football shirts without any instances of arrests in the final. According to The New York Times, the UAE accuses Qatar of fielding ineligible players due to them being not originally Qatari. The players accused were the competitions' top scorer Almoez Ali, a Sudan born striker, as well as Bassam Al-Rawi, an Iraq born defender.

2022 FIFA World Cup
Saudi Arabia, Yemen, Mauritania, the United Arab Emirates, Bahrain and Egypt in a letter asked FIFA to replace Qatar as 2022 FIFA World Cup host, calling the country as a "base of terrorism". In reaction to the Qatar diplomatic crisis over the alleged support of terrorism by the Qatari Government, the president of the German Football Association, Reinhard Grindel stated in June 2017, that "the football associations of the world should conclude that major tournaments cannot be held in countries which actively support terrorism", and that the German Football Association will talk with UEFA and the German Government in order to evaluate whether to boycott the tournament in Qatar in 2022. Hassan Al Thawadi, general secretary of Qatar’s FIFA World Cup organizing committee, stated that "Qatar does not support terrorism. Qatar is at the forefront of the fight against terrorism on the ground. It’s one of the main partners in the coalition fighting ISIS (the Islamic State group)." Thawadi said: "Our projects are going ahead as scheduled. This (blockade) is no risk in relation to the hosting of the World Cup."

In October 2017, Lieutenant General Dhahi Khalfan Tamim, deputy chief of Dubai Police, wrote about the Qatar diplomatic crisis on Twitter in Arabic; "If the World Cup leaves Qatar, Qatar’s crisis will be over … because the crisis is created to get away from it". According to observers, the message appeared to imply that the blockade was enacted due to Qatar hosting the world's biggest football event. In reaction to media coverage of his tweet, Dhahi Khalfan tweeted; "I said Qatar is faking a crisis and claims it’s besieged so it could get away from the burdens of building expensive sports facilities for the World Cup". UAE Minister of State for Foreign Affairs Anwar Gargash said the official, Dhahi Khalfan, had been misunderstood in media coverage. Gargash stated that Qatar's hosting of World Cup 2022 "should include a repudiation of policies supporting extremism & terrorism."

Hassan al-Thawadi, secretary general of the Qatar World Cup supreme committee, stated that projects were progressing as scheduled for the 2022 FIFA World Cup. Qatar's only land border and air and sea routes have been cut off by Bahrain, Egypt, Saudi Arabia and the United Arab Emirates (UAE). As the blockade came into play, World Cup organizers were asked to investigate a "Plan B", FIFA however has confidence in not exploring a "Plan B" for an alternate 2022 host. According to Thawadi, all these logistical obstacles are being overcome and building progress is continuing with only minimal cost increases, in preparation for the first World Cup in the Middle East.

Resolution 
An article published by the Financial Times stated that, according to people briefed on the matter, the Kingdom of Saudi Arabia moved towards ending the 2017 blockade against the State of Qatar after the victory of President-elect Joe Biden in 2020. An advisor to Saudi Arabia and the United Arab Emirates, was quoted as calling the shift in the Kingdom’s policy towards Qatar "a gift for Biden" signaling that Crown Prince Mohammed bin Salman had shown willingness "to take steps" towards resolving differences with Qatar. The prince is said to have been intimidated by the incoming administration, as the former administration had reportedly supported the Riyadh government in times of crisis such as casualties in the Yemen war, detention of activists, the murder of Jamal Khashoggi, etc. On the other hand, UAE’s ambassador to the US, Yousef al-Otaiba, was quoted as stating that ending the dispute was not a priority, referring to the ongoing differences with the blockaded nation.

On 4 January 2021, Kuwait, Saudi Arabia's neighbour and a fellow GCC member, along with the United States, jointly brokered a deal resolving the crisis. Under the deal, Saudi Arabia will end its blockade of its Gulf neighbour and reopen its border.

On 5 January 2021, Qatar's Emir Sheikh Tamim bin Hamad Al Thani arrived in Saudi Arabia for a GCC summit in the old town of Al-'Ula. Later, the leaders signed the Al-'Ula statement. Before the signing, Bin Salman said that Kuwait and the United States support had resulted in "the Al-'Ula declaration agreement that will be signed at this blessed summit, in which the Gulf, Arab and Islamic solidarity and stability were emphasized." In addition to the statement, a final communique was signed but their contents are not yet known and Saudi Foreign Minister Faisal bin Farhan al-Saud said it and its allies agreed to restore full ties with Doha, including resumption of flights. Qatar has apparently not fulfilled any of the 13 demands, analysts saying that the Gulf states agreed instead to a joint security declaration.

The United Nations Secretary-General, António Guterres, welcomed the end of the crisis and the opening of the airspace, land, and sea borders between Saudi Arabia, the United Arab Emirates, Bahrain, Egypt, and Qatar. In a statement issued on 5 January 2021, he expressed hope that countries concerned will continue to be positive, to strengthen their relations. He also recognized the contributions of the late Emir of Kuwait and late Sultan of Oman, who worked tirelessly towards resolving the Gulf rift. One Middle East policy analyst believed that the secret pact among the Gulf leaders is likely to have been multi-level, which includes several bilateral agreements between individual states rather than a unitary document.

 three sovereign governments had not restored diplomatic ties with Qatar.

See also
 2017 Lebanon–Saudi Arabia dispute
 Arab Cold War
 Axis of Resistance
 International Maritime Security Construct
 International propagation of Salafism and Wahhabism
 Iran–Israel proxy conflict
 Iran–Saudi Arabia proxy conflict
 Middle Eastern Cold War (disambiguation)
 OPEC
 Qatar–Saudi Arabia diplomatic conflict
 Russia–Syria–Iran–Iraq coalition
 Shia–Sunni relations

References

2010s conflicts
2020s conflicts
Conflicts in 2017
Conflicts in 2018
Conflicts in 2019
Conflicts in 2020
Conflicts in 2021
2010s in Qatar
2020s in Qatar
2017 in Qatar
2018 in Qatar
2019 in Qatar
2020 in Qatar
2021 in Qatar
June 2017 events in Asia
2017 in international relations
2018 in international relations
2019 in international relations
2020 in international relations
2021 in international relations
Iran–Saudi Arabia proxy conflict
Arab Winter
Shia–Sunni sectarian violence
Geopolitical rivalry
Gulf Cooperation Council
Politics of Qatar
Politics of the Arab world
Politics of the Middle East
Bahrain–Iran relations
Bahrain–Qatar relations
Bahrain–Turkey relations
Chad–Iran relations
Chad–Qatar relations
Chad–Turkey relations
Comoros–Iran relations
Comoros–Qatar relations
Comoros–Turkey relations
Djibouti–Iran relations
Djibouti–Qatar relations
Djibouti–Turkey relations
Egypt–Iran relations
Egypt–Qatar relations
Egypt–Turkey relations
Iran–Jordan relations
Iran–Maldives relations
Iran–Mauritania relations
Iran–Niger relations
Iran–United Arab Emirates relations
Iran–Saudi Arabia relations
Iran–Senegal relations
Iran–Qatar relations
Iran–Turkey relations
Iran–Yemen relations
Gabon–Iran relations
Gabon–Qatar relations
Gabon–Turkey relations
Jordan–Qatar relations
Jordan–Turkey relations
Maldives–Qatar relations
Maldives–Turkey relations
Mauritania–Qatar relations
Mauritania–Turkey relations
Niger–Qatar relations
Niger–Turkey relations
Qatar–Saudi Arabia relations
Qatar–Senegal relations
Qatar–United Arab Emirates relations
Qatar–Turkey relations
Qatar–Yemen relations
Saudi Arabia–Turkey relations
Senegal–Turkey relations
Turkey–United Arab Emirates relations
Turkey–Yemen relations
Censorship in the United Arab Emirates
Censorship in Saudi Arabia
Censorship in Bahrain
Censorship in Egypt